The Belessa River is a tributary of the Tekezé River in Ethiopia. Part of its course forms a section of border between Ethiopia and Eritrea.

Reference 

Rivers of Ethiopia
Rivers of Eritrea
Eritrea–Ethiopia border
International rivers of Africa
Border rivers